Charles James Monk (30 November 1824 – 10 November 1900) was an English Liberal politician who sat in the House of Commons between 1859 and 1885.

Monk was born at Peterborough, the son of Rt. Rev. James Henry Monk Bishop of Gloucester and Bristol, and his wife Jane Smart Hughes daughter of Rev. Hugh Hughes of Huneaton Warwickshire. He was educated at Eton College and Trinity College, Cambridge. At Cambridge he was the Sir W Browne's Medallist in 1845, University Members Prizeman in 1846 and 1847 and he graduated junior optime in 1847. In 1850, he was called to the bar at Lincoln's Inn. He became  Chancellor of the diocese of Bristol in 1855 and Chancellor of diocese of  Gloucester in 1859. He was also a Deputy Lieutenant and J.P. for Gloucestershire

At the 1857 general election Monk stood for parliament unsuccessfully at Cricklade.

He was elected as one of the two Members of Parliament (MPs) for Gloucester at the 1859 general election but was unseated on petition. He was re-elected for Gloucester in 1865 and held the seat until 1885. He was author of the Revenue Officers' Disabilities Removal Act, 1868.

Monk did not stand in the 1885 general election, when the parliamentary borough of Gloucester was abolished and the name transferred to a new county division with the same name, but covering a bigger area. He unsuccessfully contested the new seat in 1892, but won it in 1895 and held it until he stood down at the 1900 general election, shortly before his death.

Monk married Julia Ralli, daughter of P. S. Ralli of London in 1853.

Monk was President of the Association of Chambers of Commerce of the United Kingdom from 1881 to 1884 and became a director of the Suez Canal Company in 1884. He was author of The Golden Horn.

Monk lived at Bedwell Park, Hatfield, Hertfordshire, where he died at the age of 75.

References

External links
 

1824 births
1900 deaths
People educated at Eton College
Alumni of Trinity College, Cambridge
Members of Lincoln's Inn
Deputy Lieutenants of Gloucestershire
Members of Parliament for Gloucester
Liberal Party (UK) MPs for English constituencies
UK MPs 1859–1865
UK MPs 1865–1868
UK MPs 1868–1874
UK MPs 1874–1880
UK MPs 1880–1885
UK MPs 1895–1900
Liberal Unionist Party MPs for English constituencies